The Flyitalia MD3 Rider is an Italian ultralight and light-sport aircraft that was designed by Jaro Drostal in the Czech Republic and produced by Flyitalia of Dovera, Italy. The aircraft was supplied by Flyitalia complete and ready-to-fly.

The company went out of business and production ended in 2011, but production was resumed by a new company, Next Aircraft of Rivanazzano in 2013, who supply it ready-to-fly.

Design and development
The aircraft was designed to comply with the Fédération Aéronautique Internationale microlight rules and US light-sport aircraft rules. It features a strut-braced high-wing, a two-seats-in-side-by-side configuration enclosed cockpit, fixed tricycle landing gear and a single engine in tractor configuration.

The aircraft is made with riveted and bonded aluminum sheet semi-monocoque construction, with a welded steel cockpit cage. The engine cowling and fairings are made from composites, with the cockpit doors fashioned from carbon-fibre. A folding wing for storage and ground transport was a factory option. The standard engines factory supplied are the  Rotax 912UL and the  Rotax 912ULS four-stroke powerplant.

A float version was under consideration in 2015.

Specifications (MD3 Rider)

References

External links

2000s Italian ultralight aircraft
Light-sport aircraft
Single-engined tractor aircraft